The Baker Street Irregulars is an organization of Sherlock Holmes enthusiasts founded in 1934 by Christopher Morley. The nonprofit organization currently numbers some 300 individuals worldwide. The group has published The Baker Street Journal — an "irregular quarterly of Sherlockiana" — since 1946.

History 

The BSI was an outgrowth of Christopher Morley's informal group, "the Three Hours for Lunch Club," which discussed art and literature. The inaugural meeting of the BSI was held in 1934 at Christ Cella's restaurant in New York City. Initial attendees included William Gillette, Vincent Starrett, Alexander Woollcott, and Gene Tunney. Morley kept meetings quite irregular, but after leadership passed to Edgar W. Smith, meetings became more regular.

In February 1934, Elmer Davis, a friend of Morley, authored a constitution for the group explaining their purpose and explaining that anyone who passed a certain test was eligible to join. The May 1934 issue of Saturday Review of Literature featured the aforementioned "test" which was a crossword puzzle authored by Christopher Morley's younger brother, Frank.

Edgar W. Smith led the BSI from 1940 until 1960, initially using the title "Buttons" and later "Buttons-cum-Commissionaire". Julian Wolff was the head of the BSI from late 1960 to 1986, and used the title "Commissionaire". From 1986 until 1997, Thomas L. Stix Jr. was the leader of the organization, and used the title "Wiggins". The title "Wiggins" has since been used for the leadership position.

The organization long resisted admitting women, a policy which spawned a female-centered organization, the Adventuresses of Sherlock Holmes, whose founders had picketed an all-male BSI gathering. In 1991, the first female invested in the BSI was Dame Jean Conan Doyle. She was followed by Katherine McMahon, the first woman to solve the crossword puzzle. McMahon was followed by Edith Meiser, author of numerous Holmesian radio scripts for The Adventures of Sherlock Holmes and The New Adventures of Sherlock Holmes.

Leadership of the BSI passed to Michael Whelan in 1997, and Michael Kean in 2020.

Members of the society participate in "the game" which postulates that Holmes and Doctor Watson were real and Sir Arthur Conan Doyle was merely Watson's "literary agent".

Membership
Membership is by invitation only based on criteria unknown to the public. Members take on a name inspired by the canon with the head of the organization known as "Wiggins". Since its inception, the organization has had only 701 members. The reference volume Sherlock Holmes and the Cryptic Clues maintains an all-inclusive list of past and current members, including the year and pseudonym of their Investiture.

Notable members
Notable members of the Baker Street Irregulars, past and present, include the following:

 Karen Anderson
 Poul Anderson
 Curtis Armstrong
 Isaac Asimov
 John Ball
 William S. Baring-Gould
 John Stevens Berry
 Anthony Boucher
 Herbert Brean
 Jan Burke
 Dana Cameron
 Frank Cho
 Bert Coules
 Frederic Dannay
 Basil Davenport
 David Stuart Davies
 Elmer Davis
 August Derleth
 Michael Dirda
 The Marquess of Donegall
 Dame Jean Conan Doyle
 Stillman Drake
 Ralph Earle, II
 Lyndsay Faye
 Robert L. Fish
 Neil Gaiman
 John Gardner
 Paul Gore-Booth
 Richard Lancelyn Green
 Michael Harrison
 Jeffrey Hatcher
 Herman Herst Jr.
 Ebbe Hoff
 Banesh Hoffmann
 Richard H. Hoffmann
 Nancy Holder
 Laurie R. King
 Leslie S. Klinger
 Robert Keith Leavitt
 Robert A. W. Lowndes
 Ken Ludwig
 Bonnie MacBird
 Ronald Mansbridge
 Ira Brad Matetsky
 Thomas M. McDade
 Edith Meiser
 Nicholas Meyer
 Christopher Morley
 Frank Morley
 David F. Musto
 Lenore Glen Offord 
 Fulton Oursler
 Will Oursler
 Stuart Palmer
 Otto Penzler
 Svend Petersen
 H. C. Potter
 Fletcher Pratt
 Michael J. Quigley
 David A. Randall
 Franklin D. Roosevelt (honorary)
 Albert M. Rosenblatt
 S. J. Rozan
 Peter A. Ruber
 Richard B. Shull
 Red Smith
 Vincent Starrett
 Daniel Stashower
 Frederic Dorr Steele
 Chris Steinbrunner
 Rex Stout
 Eve Titus
 Harry Truman (honorary)
 Manly Wade Wellman 
 J. N. Williamson
 Douglas Wilmer

The Baker Street Journal
The group publishes a periodical, The Baker Street Journal. The original series of the BSJ was started in 1946, but it ceased in 1949. In 1951, Edgar Smith began publishing it again as a quarterly; it has continued publication since that time.

Scion societies
The BSI has spawned numerous "scion societies", many of which are officially recognized by the BSI. The first was The Five Orange Pips of Westchester County, New York in 1935. Independent Sherlockian groups include the Adventuresses of Sherlock Holmes, the U.K.’s Sherlock Holmes Society of London, and Canada's The Bootmakers of Toronto.

References

External links
The BSI website
 Baker Street Irregulars Trust
The Baker Street Journal
 Collection Guide to Baker Street Irregulars Papers 1923–2007 (MS Am 2717), Houghton Library, Harvard Library, Harvard University

Sherlock Holmes
Literary fan clubs
Literary societies
Organizations established in 1934